Here Be Monsters is the debut album by Ed Harcourt, released in 2001. It was nominated for the Mercury Music Prize in 2001. Tim Holmes, one-half of British dance music duo Death In Vegas, co-produced the album. The singles "Something in My Eye" and "Apple of My Eye" charted in the UK. The album reached 84 in the UK album chart.

Singles
In the UK, there were four singles released:
"Something in My Eye" (11 June 2001); CD, 7" vinyl
B-sides: "T Bone Tombstone" / "Here Be Monsters"
"She Fell Into My Arms" (10 September 2001); CD, 7" vinyl
B-sides: "I've Become Misguided" (new version) / "When Americans Come to London"
"Apple of My Eye" (21 January 2002); CD1, CD2, cassette
B-sides: "Alligator Boy" / "Weary and Bleary Eyed" / "Last of the Troubadors" / "Little Silver Bullet" / "Apple of My Eye" (video)
"Shanghai" (8 April 2002) (This single was canceled and released as a promo single only.)

Critical reception

Q listed Here Be Monsters as one of the best 50 albums of 2001.

Track listing
"Something in My Eye" – 3:41
"God Protect Your Soul" – 5:27
"She Fell into My Arms" – 3:49
"Those Crimson Tears" – 5:09
"Hanging With the Wrong Crowd" – 3:41
"Apple of My Eye" – 4:04
"Beneath the Heart of Darkness" – 7:19
"Wind Through the Trees" – 6:45
"Birds Fly Backwards" – 3:30
"Shanghai" – 3:49
"Like Only Lovers Can" – 4:54

Personnel
 Ed Harcourt – vocals, piano, pump organ, acoustic guitar, electric guitar, Wurlitzer, vibes, saxophone, harmonica, bass, beatbox, backing vocals, sampling, synthesizer, drums, percussion, string arrangement
 Nick Yeatman – drums, percussion, backing vocals, hand clapping, loops
 Hadrian Garrard – trumpet, trombone, percussion, drums, backing vocals, hand clapping, radio static
 Arnulf Lindner – double bass, electric bass, fretless bass, bowed bass, backing vocals
 Leo Abrahams – electric guitar, 12-string guitar, fretless guitar, baritone guitar, omnichord, glockenspiel, mandolin, backing vocals, string arrangement
 Tim Holmes – loops, sequencing, samples
 Dave Fridmann – backing vocals
 Martin Kelly – backing vocals
 Simon Harris – backing vocals
 Chris Scard – hand clapping
 Gil Norton – hand clapping
 Sophie Sirota – viola, string arrangement
 Max Garrard – French horn
 Howard Gott – string arrangement, violin
 Ruth Gottlieb – violin
 Sarah Willson – cello

References

2001 debut albums
Ed Harcourt albums
Heavenly Recordings albums
Albums produced by Gil Norton